The Ancient Egyptian Road-with-shrubs hieroglyph is Gardiner sign listed no. N31 for a road, "street", or pathway. It originally was a curving hieroglyph, but became a standardized straight form as well.

The Road hieroglyph is used in Egyptian hieroglyphs as an ideogram or determinative in the word w3t-(uat), for 'road'. It is also a phonogram for hr, from the word hrt, also for 'road'.

See also

Gardiner's Sign List#N. Sky, Earth, Water
List of Egyptian hieroglyphs

References

Betrò, 1995. Hieroglyphics: The Writings of Ancient Egypt, Betrò, Maria Carmela, c. 1995, 1996-(English), Abbeville Press Publishers, New York, London, Paris (hardcover)

Roads
Egyptian hieroglyphs: sky-earth-water